Crompton Corporation (formerly Crompton and Knowles) was a chemical research, production, sales and distribution company headquartered in Middlebury, Connecticut. The company produced specialty chemicals used for polymers, fire suppressants and retardants, pool and spa water purification systems and various other applications. In 2005, Crompton merged with Great Lakes Chemical Corporation to become Chemtura.

History

Crompton Corporation traced its origins to 1837 when founder William Crompton invented a loom for weaving patterns in cotton, an innovation that led in the 1840s to the founding of Crompton Loom Works in Worcester, Massachusetts by his son George Crompton. The company merged in 1879 with rival Knowles Brothers to form the Crompton & Knowles Loom Works.

In 1999, Crompton & Knowles and Witco Corporation announced an intent to form C & K Witco Corporation. The merger was completed in 2000. Shortly after the merger, the name of the company was changed to Crompton Corporation.

In 2005, Crompton merged with Great Lakes Chemical Corporation of West Lafayette, Indiana, to form Chemtura, headquartered in Philadelphia.

Crompton's ticker symbol on the New York Stock Exchange was CK.

References

Notes

Sources

Chemical companies of the United States
Companies based in New Haven County, Connecticut
Companies based in Worcester, Massachusetts
Companies established in 1837
Chemical companies disestablished in 2005
Middlebury, Connecticut
1830s establishments in Massachusetts
Chemtura